ASSR may refer to:

Politics
 Autonomous Soviet Socialist Republics of the Soviet Union
 Armenian Soviet Socialist Republic, now Armenia (generally abbreviated ArmSSR)
 Azerbaijan Soviet Socialist Republic, now Azerbaijan (generally abbreviated AzSSR)

Others
 Akademikerförbundet SSR, a Swedish trade union of professional workers
 Auditory steady-state response, a steady-state evoked potential of the brainstem in response to auditory stimuli
 Archivio storico del Senato della Repubblica, Italian parliamentary archive (generally abbreviated ASSR)